Phragmanthera is a genus of plants in the family Loranthaceae, the showy mistletoes. It is native to Africa and temperate Asia. The genus contains 35 species.

References

Loranthaceae genera
Loranthaceae